Kellyn Kai Perry-Acosta (born July 24, 1995) is an American professional soccer player who plays as a midfielder for Major League Soccer club Los Angeles FC and the United States national team.

Early life
Acosta was raised in Plano, Texas. His father is Japanese American while his mother is African American. Acosta's paternal grandmother is Japanese, and the surname Acosta comes from his Mexican paternal step-father. Plano was an overwhelmingly white city when he was growing up. In his predominantly white neighborhood, Acosta said in 2022 he long tried to hide any evidence of his Japanese roots in order to blend in to avoid bullying or any confused stares at his multiethnic family.  “I wanted to fit in so bad there were times my Asian grandma would have to pick me up and park around the corner,” he told NBC News. “It was so puzzling for some and I kind of got made fun of for it.”

Club career

FC Dallas
Acosta played for the FC Dallas Development Academy and was committed to play soccer at the University of Maryland prior to becoming a homegrown signing in July 2012 (although he was not eligible for selection until the 2013 season). He did make three MLS Reserve League appearances. He was named U.S. Soccer Development Academy Central Conference Player of the Year in 2011–12.

Acosta made his first-team debut in a 3–0 loss at Seattle in August 2013. He made nine consecutive starts from August to October of that season. His 2014 season was interrupted by a knee injury. He initially played fullback for the club, but eventually transitioned to a starting role as a defensive midfielder in 2015.

Colorado Rapids
On July 23, 2018, Acosta was traded to the Colorado Rapids in exchange for Dominique Badji. Acosta started all 12 league matches after joining Colorado, scoring two goals and adding three assists in Burgundy. On February 20, 2019, Acosta signed a three-year contract extension keeping him in Colorado through 2021, with club options for 2022 and 2023.

Acosta enjoyed similar success in 2019, making 30 MLS starts and playing 2,619 minutes, both career highs, while adding two goals and two assists.

In a pandemic-shortened 2020 campaign, Acosta scored two goals and added one assist as he made 14 starts among 15 league appearances. Acosta scored Colorado's playoff-clinching goal in a 1–0 win at Portland Timbers on Nov. 4. Acosta started and played 81 minutes in Colorado's MLS Cup Playoff first-round loss to Minnesota United FC.

Los Angeles FC
On January 14, 2022, Acosta was acquired by Los Angeles FC from the Colorado Rapids in exchange for $1.1 million in General Allocation Money ($550k GAM in 2022 and $550k GAM in 2023). The Rapids would retain a portion of any sale should Acosta be sold elsewhere. Additionally, if certain performance based metrics are met, Colorado will receive an additional $400k GAM.

International career
Acosta was born in the United States to a Japanese father, and an African American Puerto Rican mother, and was eligible for Japan, Puerto Rico or the United States. After having played in the 2011 FIFA U-17 World Cup, Acosta became the youngest member of the U.S. squad at the 2013 FIFA U-20 World Cup. He was also part of the squad two years later at the 2015 FIFA U-20 World Cup.

Acosta made his senior international debut for the United States in a friendly versus Iceland on January 31, 2016. Acosta scored his first senior international goal in a 2–1 friendly win over Ghana on July 1, 2017, curling a direct free kick into the bottom corner for the eventual game-winner. He was selected to the U.S. squad for the 2017 CONCACAF Gold Cup, which the U.S. would go on to win. Acosta appeared in five of six games, including all three knock-out matches. Acosta made six appearances in international friendlies in 2018, scoring against Colombia on Oct. 12 and assisting Josh Sargent's goal against Peru on Oct. 16.

Following an almost 24 month absence from national team duty, Acosta was selected for a December 2020 camp on November 30, 2020, alongside fellow Rapids teammates Cole Bassett and Sam Vines. Acosta replaced Sebastian Lletget in the 68th minute of a 6–0 friendly win over El Salvador on Dec 9 at Inter Miami CF Stadium in Ft. Lauderdale, Fla. Acosta was called up again in January 2021 alongside Rapids teammates Vines and Jonathan Lewis, playing 90 minutes and assisting on Lewis' second goal in a 7–0 friendly win over Trinidad & Tobago at Exploria Stadium in Orlando, Fla., on Jan. 31. During the 2021 calendar year, Acosta appeared in 21 out of a possible 22 matches for the United States becoming the first player to do so since 1994.

Acosta was a key member for 2022 World Cup qualification, playing both central and defensive midfield. Acosta jointly led the USMNT along with Tyler Adams and Antonee Robinson with 13 appearances out of a possible 14 qualifiers. Acosta made the final World Cup squad, becoming the first Asian American man to appear for the United States in a World Cup, playing in matches against Wales and Iran.

Acosta captained the US in a January 2023 friendly against Colombia, playing 90 minutes in a scoreless draw.

Career statistics

Club

International

Scores and results list United States' goal tally first.

Honors
FC Dallas
Supporters' Shield: 2016
U.S. Open Cup: 2016

Los Angeles FC
MLS Cup: 2022
Supporters' Shield: 2022

United States U17
CONCACAF U-17 Championship: 2011

United States
CONCACAF Gold Cup: 2017, 2021
CONCACAF Nations League: 2019–20

References

External links
 
 

Living people
1995 births
American soccer players
African-American soccer players
American sportspeople of Japanese descent
Soccer players from Texas
Sportspeople from Plano, Texas
Association football midfielders
FC Dallas players
Colorado Rapids players
Los Angeles FC players
Major League Soccer players
United States men's youth international soccer players
United States men's under-20 international soccer players
United States men's under-23 international soccer players
United States men's international soccer players
2015 CONCACAF U-20 Championship players
2017 CONCACAF Gold Cup players
2021 CONCACAF Gold Cup players
2022 FIFA World Cup players
CONCACAF Gold Cup-winning players
Major League Soccer All-Stars
Homegrown Players (MLS)
21st-century African-American sportspeople